Jakob Tischhauser (born 26 March 1942) is a former Swiss alpine skier.

Career
During his career he has achieved 5 results among the top 3 in the World Cup. He was 4th in Giant Slalom at the FIS Alpine World Ski Championships 1966.

World Cup results
Top 3

National titles
Tischhauser has won two national championships at individual senior level.

Swiss Alpine Ski Championships
Giant slalom: 1970
Slalom: 1967

References

External links
 
 

1942 births
Living people
Swiss male alpine skiers